Carole Nyakudya is a prominent Zimbabwean gospel music artist, entrepreneur, a founding member of the Zimpraise Choir and presenter for a popular online television platform, Zimbolive TV.

Background

Born in Zimbabwe in 1978, Nyakudya grew up in the city of Bulawayo then migrated to the United Kingdom in 1997 where she started a career as a mental health professional for the NHS. Nyakudya has a Diploma in Mental Health Nursing which she attained at Birmingham University, BSc in Health Studies from Wolverhampton University and an MSc in Public Health & Health Development that she studied at Birmingham City University.

Carole Nyakudya became notable in 2005 when she released her debut album This Is Now which was nominated for Outstanding Album Of The Year at the National Arts Merit Awards in 2005. Nyakudya is a founding member of a gospel music group, Zimpraise Choir which was founded in 2006.

In 2013 Carole Nyakuya established Lorac International a UK labor recruitment company and has had some recognition in 2021 for her activities with the company. She contributed as a co-author with other women who shared about real life challenges in a 2017 book titled Beyond the scars (Overcomers Book 1).

Discography

Albums
This is Now 2005
All For You 2008
Dwelling Place 2017

Singles

Recognition
Outstanding Music Album (This is Now) National Arts Merit Awards (NAMA) 2005 nomination.

Female Gospel Artist of the Year Zimbabwe Music and Arts Awards 2016 winner

Outstanding Female Gospel Artist PERMICAN Awards 2016 nomination

Media Personality of the year Zimbabwe Achievers Awards 2017 nomination

Best International Gospel Artiste of the year Zimbabwe Achievers Awards 2018 nomination

Best Media Presenter All Women Achievers Awards 2020 nomination

Female Entrepreneur of the Year Zimbabwe Achievers Awards 2021

References 

Living people
1978 births
Zimbabwean musicians